The men's 100 metre freestyle event at the 2008 Olympic Games took place on 12–14 August at the Beijing National Aquatics Center in Beijing, China. There were 64 competitors from 55 nations.

Summary

Alain Bernard stormed home on the final lap to claim France's first ever gold medal in the event with a time of 47.21. Australia's world record holder Eamon Sullivan enjoyed a great start in the first 50 metres, but ended up with a silver in 47.32, just 0.11 of a second behind Bernard. U.S. swimmer Jason Lezak and Brazil's César Cielo tied for the bronze medal in a matching time of 47.67.

Two-time defending champion Pieter van den Hoogenband finished the race in fifth place at 47.75. Although he missed an opportunity to attain a third straight triumph in the same event, Van den Hoogenband became the first ever swimmer to reach the final at his fourth Olympics. Four months later, he announced his retirement from the sport, ending an Olympic career with a total of seven medals, including three golds.

Van den Hoogenband was followed in sixth by South Africa's Lyndon Ferns (48.04), and in seventh by Sullivan's teammate Matt Targett (48.20). After missing out the semifinals in Athens four years earlier, Sweden's Stefan Nystrand rounded out the finale to eighth place in 48.33.

Earlier in the semifinals, Bernard and Sullivan exchanged world-record performances to set up a battle race for the final. Swimming in the first heat, Bernard delivered a time of 47.20 to erase a 0.04-second standard set by Sullivan during his lead-off leg in the 4 × 100 m freestyle relay. A few minutes later, Sullivan had taken back the record in the second semifinal at 47.05.

Background

This was the 25th appearance of the men's 100 metre freestyle. The event has been held at every Summer Olympics except 1900 (when the shortest freestyle was the 200 metres), though the 1904 version was measured in yards rather than metres.

Four of the eight finalists from the 2004 Games returned: two-time gold medalist Pieter van den Hoogenband of the Netherlands, fourth-place finisher Ryk Neethling of South Africa, fifth-place finisher Filippo Magnini of Italy, and sixth-place finisher Duje Draganja of Croatia.

While van den Hoogenband was the returning champion, the clear favorites in the event were Frenchman Alain Bernard and Australian Eamon Sullivan. Bernard had broken the Dutch swimmer's world record, with Sullivan coming within 0.02 seconds of Bernard's new record.

Armenia, Aruba, the Cayman Islands, Kenya, and Serbia each made their debut in the event. The United States made its 24th appearance, most of any nation, having missed only the boycotted 1980 Games.

Qualification

Each National Olympic Committee (NOC) could enter up to two swimmers if both met the A qualifying standard, or one swimmer if he met the B standard. For 2008, the A standard was 49.23 seconds while the B standard was 50.95 seconds. The qualifying window was 15 March 2007 to 15 July 2008; only approved meets (generally international competitions and national Olympic trials) during that period could be used to meet the standards. There were also universality places available; if no male swimmer from a nation qualified in any event, the NOC could enter one male swimmer in an event.

The two swimmers per NOC limit had been in place since the 1984 Games.

Competition format

This freestyle swimming competition consisted of three rounds: heats, semifinals, and a final. The swimmers with the best 16 times in the heats advanced to the semifinals. The swimmers with the best 8 times in the semifinals advanced to the final. Swim-offs were used as necessary to break ties for advancement to the next round.

Records

Prior to this competition, the existing world and Olympic records were as follows:

The following records were set during this competition:

* World and Olympic record split from the 4 × 100 m freestyle relay

Schedule

The competition moved to a three-day schedule, rather than two days as in the past.

All times are China Standard Time (UTC+8)

Results

Heats

Semifinals

Bernard held the world record only briefly, setting it in the first semifinal heat before Sullivan broke it in the second heat.

Final

References

External links
Official Olympic Report

Men's freestyle 0100 metre
2008 Summer Olympics
Men's events at the 2008 Summer Olympics